Six awards were awarded in the categories: National Print; Periodicals; Photojournalism; Radio; Television Documentary; and Television News.

The award ceremony, held on Wednesday 19 June 1996, was hosted by Shahnaz Pakravan.

The overall winners were The News Team at ITN Channel 4 for their coverage of "War Crimes in Bosnia". The overall award was presented by Ken Wiwa.

Marc Jobst said: "I'm enormously proud to receive this award from Amnesty International because I have such respect for their work. The programme they awarded was about Dana Tep and her daughter Ramoni who were subjected to slavery under the Khmer Rouge..."

Dana and Ramoni Tep received a standing ovation at the ceremony, as they bravely chose the occasion of the AIUK Press Awards to come out from years of hiding to reveal their true identities.

1996 Awards

See also

References

External links
 Amnesty International UK (AIUK) website
 Amnesty International UK Media Awards at the AIUK Website
 Amnesty International Website

Amnesty International
British journalism awards
Human rights awards
1996 awards in the United Kingdom
June 1996 events in the United Kingdom